The Orion is a skyscraper located at 350 West 42nd Street between Eighth and Ninth Avenues in the Hell's Kitchen or Clinton neighborhood of Manhattan, New York City, in the U.S. state of New York. The building rises 604 feet (184 m) above street level, containing 551 residential units across 58 floors, and is the 128th tallest building in New York. Despite its relatively modest height for a skyscraper, the residential building has dominated the 42nd Street landscape west of Times Square since its topout in September 2005, and the building has views of New York City in every direction.

The building was designed by the architectural firm CetraRuddy, who also designed One Madison Park.

Notable incident
Cheslie Kryst, the winner of the Miss USA 2019 pageant who lived on the 9th floor, jumped to her death from the 29th floor on January 30, 2022. Her death was determined to be a suicide.

References

External links

Residential skyscrapers in Manhattan
Hell's Kitchen, Manhattan

Residential buildings in Manhattan
42nd Street (Manhattan)
Residential buildings completed in 2006